Alfred George Broadhurst (July 11, 1927 – July 11, 2014) was an American speed skater. He competed in two events at the 1952 Winter Olympics.

References

1927 births
2014 deaths
American male speed skaters
Olympic speed skaters of the United States
Speed skaters at the 1952 Winter Olympics
Sportspeople from Boston